Chris Genoa (born March 5, 1977) is an American novelist. He is most known for his small press bestseller Foop! (Eraserhead Press, 2005), a bizarre science fiction comedy.  He is part of the Bizarro literary movement, a collection of authors and small presses who specialize in weird, offbeat fiction.

Biography 
Chris Genoa was born in Philadelphia, Pennsylvania, studied English Literature and Creative Writing at The College of William and Mary and King's College London, and Film Production at The University of New Orleans.  He currently lives in Brooklyn, New York.

Novels 
Genoa's first novel, Foop!, is a dark comedy that follows a time traveler's surreal journey to the end of the world. Foop! was published in April 2005 by Eraserhead Press and quickly developed a cult following.

Genoa's second book, Lick Your Neighbor, is an alternate history dark comedy about America's First Thanksgiving. The novel was completed in 2007 and published in 2010. Genoa is currently writing The Monkey and the Barrel, a dark kung fu comedy.

Bibliography 
 Foop! (Eraserhead Press, 2005)
 Lick Your Neighbor (Eraserhead Press, 2010)
 The Monkey and the Barrel (novel; forthcoming)

Interviews
Gothamist Interview with Chris Genoa. August 2005
Koko Interview with Chris Genoa, 2004
Eternal Night Interview with Chris Genoa, 2005
Publishers Weekly Interview with Chris Genoa, September 2009

Notes and references

 Amazon.com: Lick Your Neighbor: Chris Genoa: Books

External links
Chris Genoa's website

21st-century American novelists
American male novelists
American humorists
American fantasy writers
American science fiction writers
Alumni of King's College London
College of William & Mary alumni
1977 births
Living people
21st-century American male writers